Abraham Pole (born 1999/2000) is a New Zealand rugby union player who plays for  in the National Provincial Championship (NPC). His playing position is prop.

Early life
Pole attended Otago Boys' High School where he played for the school's First XV.

In 2017, he played for the New Zealand Schools team. He has played Dunedin club rugby for Harbour RFC.

Rugby career
On 7 August he made his debut in a 26–19 home win against .

Reference list

External links
Itsrugby.co.uk profile

New Zealand rugby union players
Living people
Rugby union props
Otago rugby union players
People educated at Otago Boys' High School
Year of birth missing (living people)
Crusaders (rugby union) players
Moana Pasifika players